Makronia railway station is a railway station in Makronia town of Madhya Pradesh. Its code is MKRN. It serves Makronia town. Makronia is a 'D' Category railway station of West Central Railway Zone of Indian Railways. The station consists of 2 platforms. Passenger, Express and Superfast trains halt here.

References

See also
Saugor railway station
Khurai railway station

Railway stations in Sagar district
Jabalpur railway division